The Cinema of Northern Ireland is small. Traditionally the majority of films made in or about Northern Ireland have focused almost entirely on the Troubles; however, with the advent of peace since 1998, this is starting to change.

List of films from Northern Ireland 
This list covers films shot and set in Northern Ireland either in part or in whole

'71 (2013)
An Everlasting Piece (2000)
The Best Years
Bloody Sunday (TV film; 2002)
Bobby Sands: 66 Days (2016)
The Boxer (1997)
Cal (1984)
Cherrybomb (2009)
Closing the Ring (2007)
The Crying Game (1992)
Dear Sarah (TV film; 1990)
Divorcing Jack (1998)
Fifty Dead Men Walking (2009)
Five Minutes of Heaven (2009)
Four Days in July (TV film; 1985)
Ghost Machine (2009)
Good Vibrations (2013)
Grabbers (2012)
H3 (2001)
Hidden Agenda (1990)
How About You (2007)
Hunger (2008)
The Informant (TV film; 1997)
In the Name of the Father (1993)
Jacqueline (1956)
Johnny Was (2006)
Jump (2012)
Killing Bono (2011)
Man About Dog (2004)
Mickybo and Me (2004)
The Mighty Celt (2005)
Middletown (2006)
Miss Conception (2008)
The Most Fertile Man in Ireland (2000)
Odd Man Out (1947)
Resurrection Man (1998)
Shadow Dancer (2012)
Shoot to Kill (TV film; 1990)
Some Mother's Son (1996)
This is the Sea (1997)
Titanic Town (1998)
Whole Lotta Sole (aka Stand Off; 2012)

Films shot in Northern Ireland 
This list covers films shot, or partly shot, in Northern Ireland but not set there

A Prayer for the Dying (1987)
Christopher and His Kind (TV film; 2011)
City of Ember (2008)
Your Highness (2011)

Films about Northern Ireland 
This list covers films that deal or make allusion to Northern Irish issues but were neither shot nor set there

The Craic (1999)
The Devil's Own (1997)
Hennessy (1975)
Patriot Games (1992)

See also 
List of films set in Northern Ireland
Cinema of Europe
Cinema of Ireland
Cinema of Scotland
Cinema of the United Kingdom
Cinema of Wales

External links 
CAIN Guide to Movies about the Troubles

Further reading 
Hill, John, Cinema and Northern Ireland: Film, Culture and Politics (BFI Publishing; 2006)
McIlroy, Brian, Shooting to Kill: Filmmaking and the "Troubles" in Northern Ireland (Steveston Press; 2001)